Al Jahra Sporting Club is a Kuwaiti professional football club based in Jahra. They won the Kuwaiti Premier League once, in 1990. They participated in the Kuwaiti Premier League 21 times, most recently in the 2007–2008 season. Al Jahra reached the Kuwait Emir Cup final twice in recent times, 1996 and 2002, where they lost to Al Arabi 1–2 and Kuwait Club 0–1.

Al Jahra Sporting Club also offers various sports such as basketball, volleyball, boxing, and prides itself in fencing.

Achievements

Official
 Kuwait Premier League: 1
 1990
 Kuwaiti Division One: 4
 1987/88
 2002/03
 2019/20
 2021/22
 Kuwait Emir Cup: Runners-up
 1996
 2002
 2013

Friendly
 Tishreen Cup : 1
 2007

Players

|-----
! colspan="9" bgcolor="#B0D3FB" align="left" |
|----- bgcolor="#DFEDFD"

 

|-----
! colspan="9" bgcolor="#B0D3FB" align="left" |
|----- bgcolor="#DFEDFD"

|-----
! colspan="9" bgcolor="#B0D3FB" align="left" |
|----- bgcolor="#DFEDFD"

AFC Asian Cup players
1996 AFC Asian Cup 
 
 Wail Al Habashi

2000 AFC Asian Cup 
 
 Khalaf Al-Salamah

2012 Africa Cup of Nations  / 
 
 André Macanga

Managerial history

Asian record

 GCC Champions League: 4 appearances
1992: 6th position
2012: Quarterfinal
2014: Quarterfinal
2015: Quarterfinal

 Arab Champions League: 1 appearance
2012: First round

Club sponsors
  Al Shahed 
  Al Jeraiwey

External links 
 
 Al Jahra page on goalzz.com

Jahra
Association football clubs established in 1966
 
1966 establishments in Kuwait
Sports teams in Kuwait